Tarak-juk, also called uyu-juk or milk porridge, is a juk, or Korean porridge, made with milk and rice (glutinous japonica variety). It was a part of the Korean royal court cuisine and was also patronized by yangban (scholarly-officials).

Names and etymology 
The Korean word  is a compound consisting of  meaning "dairy" and  meaning "porridge".

The word  is derived from the Korean transliteration of the Mongolian word  or Old Turkic . Cognates include modern Mongolian  and Kurdish , both meaning "cheese". As suggested by its etymology, traditional Korean tarak was heavily influenced by the customs of Central Asian—especially Mongolian— fermented milk products.

History 
The history of tarak-juk dates back to the consumption of milk in Korean history. The Kingdom of Goryeo (918–1392) kept Yuu-so (dairy cow office), and nobles consumed nakso (cheese). However, dairy cattle were rare and usually milk was available only after a cow gave birth. Moreover, the freshness of milk was a vital factor as it could not be delivered over long distances. Therefore, milk was considered a supplementary food for special occasions or a recovery food after illness.

During the Joseon era (1392–1897), the dairy cow office was relocated to a royal court ranch on Mount Naksan east of Seoul. It was renamed Tarak-saek (dairy department). Royal physicians took charge of gathering milk and making tarak-juk to present to the king. From the tenth lunar month to the first month of the next lunar year, they offered tarak-juk to the royal court. The Hall of Senior Officials also offered tarak-juk to elderly officials. Recipes for tarak-juk are recorded in the Joseon books such as Revised and Augmented Farm Management and the Women's Encyclopedia.

Preparation 
Pre-soaked glutinous rice is ground by millstone, sieved, and left to settle. The deposits of ground rice, called muri, are boiled, and milk is added slowly on a gentle simmer over a low flame with constant stirring. Salt is then added, to sweeten the porridge, honey can be added. The ratio between milk and muri recorded in the Women's Encyclopedia is 1:0.8, with adjustments allowed according to taste. However, the book advises the amount of muri should not exceed that of milk.

See also 

 Jatjuk
 Korean royal court cuisine
 List of porridges

References 

Juk
Korean royal court cuisine
Milk dishes